"Un'altra Come Te" is the first single from Bloom 06's second album Crash Test 02. The single was released on May 2, 2008.

The single only contains the original version of "Un'altra Come Te" on Crash Test 02, which has been released on May 23, 2008. Currently, the single is only available on iTunes, in January 2009 the English version, Being Not Like You has been physically released in Germany, Austria and Switzerland.

Track listing

Un'altra Come Te 
"Un'altra Come Te" - 3:50

Being Not Like You 
"Being Not Like You" - 3:50
"Being Not Like You - Elektro Pop Remix" - 4:41
"Un'altra Come Te" - 3:50
"Blue (Da Ba Dee) - Bloom 06 extended concept" - 7:46

External links
Un'altra Come Te Official Music Video
Bloom 06 official website

2008 singles
2008 songs
Song articles with missing songwriters